This is a general list of musicals, including Broadway musicals, West End musicals, and musicals that premiered in other places, as well as film musicals, whose titles fall into the M-Z alphabetic range. (See also List of notable musical theatre productions, List of operettas, List of Bollywood films, List of rock musicals.)

See List of musicals: A to L for additional titles.

M

N

O

P

Q

R

S

T

U

V

W

X

Y

Z 

See List of musicals: A to L for additional titles.

References

 
Musicals: M To Z
M to Z